Snap legislative elections are scheduled to be held in Guinea-Bissau on 4 June 2023. Incumbent president Umaro Sissoco Embalo dissolved the parliament on 16 May 2022, accusing deputies of corruption and "unresolvable" differences between the National People's Assembly and other government branches.

Electoral system 
The 102 members of the National People's Assembly are elected by two methods; 100 by closed list proportional representation from 27 multi-member constituencies and two from single-member constituencies representing expatriate citizens in Africa and Europe.

Results

References 

Elections in Guinea-Bissau
Guinea-Bissau
Legislative
June 2023 events in Africa